Angelique's Isle is a 2018 Canadian historical drama film, directed by Marie-Hélène Cousineau and Michelle Derosier. Based on a true story set in 1845, the film stars Julia Jones as Angelique Mott, an Anishinaabe woman who accompanies her voyageur husband Charlie (Charlie Carrick) on an expedition to search for potential mining sites during the Copper Rush, only for the couple to be abandoned on an island in Lake Superior and forced to survive the harsh winter on their own.

The film's cast also includes Tantoo Cardinal, Aden Young, Stephen McHattie, Brendt Thomas Diabo, Greg Tremblay, Anthony Roch and Dennis Dubinsky.

The film premiered at the Atlantic Film Festival in September 2018, before going into commercial release in 2019.

It won three awards at the 2018 American Indian Film Festival, for Best Film, Best Actress (Jones) and Best Supporting Actress (Cardinal).

References

External links

Angelique's Isle at Library and Archives Canada

2018 films
2010s historical drama films
First Nations films
Canadian historical drama films
English-language Canadian films
Films shot in Ontario
Films set in Northern Ontario
Films based on works by Canadian writers
2010s English-language films
2010s Canadian films